The Rebels Not In (1998) is the third and final album recorded by the American indie rock group The Halo Benders.

The album was released on K Records on February 3, 1998, on vinyl LP and compact disc.  It was the third full-length release from the Halo Benders, a side project of Calvin Johnson (of Beat Happening) and Doug Martsch (of Built to Spill).  Its catalogue number is KLP81. It has a generally more polished sound than the Halo Benders' previous efforts.

The unique intro drum beat on "Bury Me" is a nod to The Wedding Present song "Yeah Yeah Yeah Yeah Yeah," from their 1994 album Watusi.  This is further evidenced by Martsch's chorus of "Yeah Yeah Yeah Yeah."

Critical reception
Magnet wrote that the album "merged the playful spirit of early K with higher-end production." Pitchfork Media ranked "Virginia Reel Around the Fountain" at #188 on its "Top 200 Tracks of the 1990s" list. CMJ New Music Monthly considered "Turn It My Way" to be the highlight of the album.

Track listing
 "Virginia Reel Around the Fountain" – 6:18
 "Your Asterisk" – 2:50
 "Lonesome Sundown" – 4:43
 "Devil City Destiny" – 4:56
 "Bury Me" – 3:25
 "Surfers Haze" – 3:11
 "Do That Thing" – 3:47
 "Love Travels Faster" – 4:11
 "Turn It My Way" – 4:22
 "Rebels Got a Hole in It" – 6:02
 "Foggy Bottom" – 4:39

References 

1998 albums
K Records albums
Albums produced by Phil Ek
The Halo Benders albums